The Wiggles is the debut album by the Australian children's band the Wiggles, released in 1991 by ABC Music distributed by EMI. As a student music project at Macquarie University, the band assembled a group of songs reworked from the Cockroaches as well as arrangements of children's music.  It was the only album that involved Phillip Wilcher as one of the group's members. The album sold 100,000 copies, and received Australian Record Industry Association (ARIA) and Australasian Performing Right Association (APRA) awards.

Background and development

In 1991, while working with the early childhood music department at Macquarie University, Phillip Wilcher met musician and former member of the Australian rock group the Cockroaches, Anthony Field, who was studying child development.  According to Wilcher, Field asked him to join the Wiggles, which would become "Australia's foremost children's entertainment act", and to help them produce the album. The album was dedicated to the memory of Paul Field's infant daughter, Bernadette, who had died of SIDS in 1988.

Wilcher financed and "contributed the most musically to the debut album", composing 75% of the music. Like a university assignment, they produced a folder of essays that explained the educational value of each song on the album.
They needed a keyboardist "to bolster the rock-n-roll feel of the project", so Field asked his old bandmate Fatt, for his assistance in what they thought would be a temporary project. Recording sessions were held at Wilcher's home, and the album cost approximately A$4,000 to produce.

The group reworked a few Cockroaches tunes to better fit the genre of children's music; for example, according to Field, a Cockroaches song he wrote, "Mr. Wiggles Back in Town" became "Get Ready to Wiggle" and inspired the band's name because they thought that wiggling described the way children dance.  There was also a piece by Phillip Wilcher, "Summer Dance", that appeared on the album, as "Archie's Theme".

Promotion and release
At first, the Wiggles filmed two music videos with the Australian Broadcasting Corporation (ABC) to promote their first album; they also decided to create a self-produced, forty-minute long video version of their album.  Finances were limited, so there was no post-production editing of the video project.  They used Field's nieces and nephews as additional cast, and hired the band's girlfriends to perform in character costumes.  Cook's wife made their first costumes.  They used two cameras and visually checked the performance of each song; that way, according to Paul Field, it took them less time to complete a forty-minute video than it took other production companies to complete a three-minute music video. Jeremy Fabinyi, the Cockroaches' former manager, became the Wiggles' first manager.  Using connections gained during the Cockroaches years, he negotiated with the ABC to air their TV show and to help them promote their first recording.

Field distributed copies of their album to his young students to test out the effect of the group's music on children; one child's mother returned it the next day because her child would not stop listening to it, having listened to the track Dorothy the Dinosaur 40 times.
The album sold 100,000 copies in 1991. Australian Record Industry Association (ARIA) awarded the band members, including Wilcher, with gold and platinum certificates for the album.

In 1992, Wilcher left the Wiggles and submitted a letter of resignation because he wanted to continue composing classical music. According to fellow member, Greg Page, "Archie had considerable input into the arrangement of some songs on that first CD ... he is quite a musical genius ... his creative flair suited those kinds of pieces ... However ... the musical direction of the Wiggles was changing".

Track listing

Release history
The album was released in 1991 in CD and cassette formats:

 ABC Records: 510 082-2
 ABC Records: 510 082-4
 ABC Music: 814338 2

Personnel
Credits from The Wiggles album booklet.

The Wiggles
 Phillip Wilcher – piano, vocals
 Murray Cook – guitar, bass guitar, vocals, water bubble sounds
 Gregory Page – lead vocals, guitar, hand claps
 Jeff Fatt – accordion, Emax, sequencing, Mischief's voice
 Anthony Field – tin whistle, didgeridoo, vocals, chief kabasa player

Production
 Anthony Field – producer
 Steve Pomfrett – engineer

References

Notes

The Wiggles albums
1991 debut albums
Children's music albums